Deodar may refer to :

Places in Gujarat, India 
 Diyodar or Deodar or Diodar, a town in Gujarat, India
 Deodar State, a former princely state in Banas Kantha, with the above town as capital
 Deodar (Vidhan Sabha constituency), with seat in the above town, located in there above taluka of Banaskantha District

Other uses 
 Cedrus deodara, tree species from India known for Christmas-tree shape 
 Deodar forests, where the above cedar abounds, in Western Himalayas from Gandak river in central Nepal to the Hindukush range in Afghanistan